The 2015 World Pastry Cup (French:Coupe du Monde de la Pâtisserie 2015) is an international pastry contest which took place in 25–26 January 2015 in Lyon, France.

Competition
For 10 straight hours each participating team composed of three candidates were tasked to complete 21 culinary items; 3 chocolate deserts, 3 frozen fruit desserts, 12 identical deserts on a plate, and 3 artistic creations with each made from three different materials - sugar, chocolate and sculpted hydric ice. The three candidates from each team specializes either on pastries, chocolate and in ice cream. The 2015 edition was the first time that the candidates were tasked to make a sculpture out of a whole block of Valrhona chocolate to be included in their artistic creation made of chocolate. The candidates used two identically sized blocked ice for their ice sculpture. For their sculpture made of sugar, the sculpture was required to make of at least 50 percent drawn sugar and blown sugar. A new pointing system was also utilized for the 2015 edition.

The 21 entries will be judged based on taste, artistic presentation and coherence with the theme.

Participants
21 teams from 21 nations qualified to participate at the 2015 World Pastry Cup. Algeria, Philippines and Guatemala made their debut at the 2015 edition of the tournament. France, the 2013 champions and host of the World Pastry Cup, did not participate at the tournament.

Final rankings

Source:

Awards

Overall

Special Prizes
Special Prizes were also awarded. The Philippines which participated for the first time won the special prize for Sculpted Ice. Guatemala were conferred with the Team Spirit award due to the team member's solidarity and close working. Italy was awarded the Best Innovative Spirit for the team's usage of icing for its entries. Japan was awarded the special prize, Press for its chocolate desserts. Social media users choose the winners of the Best Promotional Poster, which was awarded to Morocco.

References

World Pastry Cup
Cooking competitions in France